This article contains a list of links to pages referring to sports broadcasting rights in various countries.

By region

Africa 
 Middle East & North Africa

Asia and Oceania 
 Australia
China 
India 
Japan
 New Zealand
 Philippines
Saudi Arabia
 South Korea
 Thailand
 Vietnam

Americas 
 Brazil
 Canada
 Caribbean 
 Central America
Dominican Republic 
 Mexico
 Puerto Rico
 South America
 United States

Europe 
 Albania
 Belarus
 Belgium
 Bosnia and Herzegovina
Bulgaria
 Croatia
 Denmark
 Estonia
 France
 Finland
 Germany
 Greece
 Hungary
 Ireland
 Italy
 Kosovo
 Latvia
 Lithuania
 Montenegro
 Netherlands
 Portugal
 Poland
 Romania
 Russia
 Serbia
 Spain
 Sweden
 United Kingdom

By event

Association football 
 FIFA World Cup
 FIFA Club World Cup
 UEFA Euro 2024
 UEFA Champions League
 UEFA Europa League
UEFA Conference League
UEFA Super Cup
 English Premier League
 FA Cup
 EFL Cup
 Spanish La Liga
 Copa del Rey
 German Bundesliga
 DFB-Pokal
 Italian Serie A
 Coppa Italia
 French Ligue 1
Turkish Süper Lig
Dutch Eredivisie

Basketball 
 NBA
 Euroleague

Motorsports 
 Formula 1
 MotoGP
 FIA World Rally Championship
 Formula E

Multisports 
 2022 Winter Olympics
 2020 Summer Olympics

Tennis 
 Australian Open
 French Open
 Wimbledon
 US Open

Sports broadcasting contracts
Sport-related lists